Naked in the Wind or The Island of Nude Women (French: L'île aux femmes nues) is a 1953 French comedy film directed by Henri Lepage and starring Félix Oudart, Lili Bontemps, Armand Bernard and Jane Sourza. In 1962 it was released in America in a dubbed version and marketed as an exploitation film. It was shot on location at the naturist resort on Levant Island on the French Riviera.

Synopsis
During an election in a small town in Provence, one of the candidates seeks to discredit his rival the local confectioner Antonin Lespinasse. He has him seduced by the nightclub singer Mademoiselle Pataflan who then lures him to a nudist camp, where incriminating photographs are taken of him. However he finds joy in the community and is soon elected as its president.

Cast
 Félix Oudart as Antonin Lespinasse
 Lili Bontemps as 	Mademoiselle Pataflan
 Armand Bernard as 	Théophase Darcepoil
 Jane Sourza as 	Madame Lespinasse
 Jean Tissier as 	Professeur Martifole
 Antonin Berval as Farigoule
 Alice Tissot as 	Madame Darcepoil
 Henri Arius as 	L'aubergiste
 Jacques Ciron as 	Hyacinthe
 Michel Flamme as 	Alain
 Fransined as Marco
 Jim Gérald as Oscar le borgne
 Saint-Granier as 	Le patron du cabaret
 Sylvain as Le commissaire
 Nicole Besnard
 Lolita Lopez  		
 Pierre Naugier	
 Nicole Regnault

References

Bibliography
 Rège, Philippe. Encyclopedia of French Film Directors, Volume 1. Scarecrow Press, 2009.
 Krzywinska, Tanya. Sex and the Cinema. Wallflower, 2006.

External links 
 

1953 films
1953 comedy films
French comedy films
1950s French-language films
Films directed by Henri Lepage
Films set on the French Riviera
Films set in Provence-Alpes-Côte d'Azur
1950s French films